Henric Sturehed (born 9 October 1990) is a Swedish professional golfer who has played on the European Tour.

Professional career
Sturehed had his breakthrough competing on the 2017 MENA Golf Tour where he won the season-ending MENA Tour Championship by a convincing nine strokes, setting a course record of 63 in the process. Sturehed became the fourth Swede after Per Barth, Christofer Blomstrand and Fredrik From to win a MENA Tour event. He finished the season second on the MENA Tour Order of Merit which earned him cards on the Sunshine Tour and the Asian Development Tour, along with starts at the Omega Dubai Desert Classic and KLM Open on the European Tour.

In November 2017, Sturehed became one of 33 players to earn European Tour cards through Q School, and he made his debut at the AfrAsia Bank Mauritius Open a few weeks later.

On the 2018 European Tour, Sturehed finished T5 at Open de España in April, five strokes behind winner Jon Rahm. In July at Open de France, a 48 OWGR point Rolex Series event with the season's strongest field in continental Europe, he finished T12 and four strokes behind victorious compatriot Alex Norén. He ended the season 151st on the Order of Merit, to spend 2019 on the Challenge Tour. There he recorded top-10 finishes at the Challenge de España, Irish Challenge and Open de Portugal, where he was co-leader ahead of the last round after a seven-under-par 65 third round and finished T5. In the strongly reduced 2020 season his best finish was T5 at Challenge de España.

He has continued to make the occasional MENA Tour start and finished T2 at the 2019 Journey to Jordan Tour Championship and T3 at the 2020 Royal Golf Club Bahrain Open.

Professional wins (2)

Nordic Golf League wins (1)

MENA Tour wins (1)

Playoff record
Sunshine Tour playoff record (0–1)

Challenge Tour playoff record (0–1)

See also
2017 European Tour Qualifying School graduates

References

External links
 
 
 
 
 

Swedish male golfers
European Tour golfers
Sportspeople from Östergötland County
Sportspeople from Linköping
1990 births
Living people